Christian Meyer (born 22 October 1977 in Orkdal) is a retired Norwegian ski jumper.

In the World Cup he finished once among the top 10, with a sixth place from Zakopane in January 1996.

Coach
From 2006 he is a skijumping coach. From summer 2011, he is the coach of the female Norwegian team.

References

1977 births
Living people
People from Orkdal
Norwegian male ski jumpers
Norwegian ski jumping coaches
Sportspeople from Trøndelag
20th-century Norwegian people